Euphranta mikado is a species of tephritid or fruit flies in the genus Euphranta of the family Tephritidae.

References

Trypetinae